Pavlo Petrovych Skoropadskyi (– 26 April 1945) was a Ukrainian aristocrat, military and state leader, decorated Imperial Russian Army and Ukrainian Army general of Cossack heritage. Skoropadskyi became Hetman of Ukraine following a coup on 29 April 1918.

Origin 

Pavlo Skoropadskyi was born into the Skoropadsky family of Ukrainian military leaders and statesmen, that distinguished themselves since the 17th century when Fedir Skoropadsky participated in the Battle of Zhovti Vody. His grandson Ivan Skoropadsky (1646-1722) was Hetman of the Ukrainian Cossacks from 1708. The present Skoropadskys descend from his brother.

His patrilineal great-grandfather was Mikhail Yakivich Skoropadskyi, son of Yakiv Mikhailovich Skoropadskyi and wife, and his patrilineal great-grandmother was Pulcheria ...vna Markevicha.

Skoropadskyi's father Petro Skoropadsky (1834–1885) was a Cavalry Guard Colonel and a veteran of the Caucasian War (Subjugation of Circassia, 1863). Afterwards he served as a speaker (marshal) for the Starodub County Council (zemstvo) (1869–1885) until his death.

Skoropadskyi's aunt Countess Yelyzaveta Myloradovych (née Skoropadska) (1832–1890) was a Ukrainian public activist. She was one of the main sponsors for foundation first Ukrainian scientific institution Shevchenko Scientific Society in Lviv. Her husband was Count Lev Myloradovych whose mother was from the Kochubey family.

His paternal grandfather Ivan Mikhailovich Skoropadskyi (30 January 1804 – 8 February 1887) also served as a speaker for the Pryluky County (1844–1847) and Poltava Governorate (1847–1852) councils. He also was known for building the Trostyanets Arboretum (today in Chernihiv Oblast). He married in 1829 his paternal grandmother Elisaveta P...vna Tarnovska. Skoropadskyi's father Petro Ivanovych Skoropadskyi (6 March 1834 - 30 June 1885) was also a descendant of the Tarnovsky family, while Skoropadskyi's mother Maria Andreievna Miklaszevska, daughter of Andrei ...vich Miklaszevski and wife Daria ...vna Olsufieva, was a descendant of Miklashewsky and Olsufiev families.

Skoropadskyi grew up at his father's estate in Trostianets, Pryluky County, Poltava Governorate. He attended a gymnasium in Starodub and later graduated from the Page Corps cadet school in Saint Petersburg.

Military career

First assignments and Russo-Japanese War 

In 1893, Skoropadsky graduated from the Page Corps and was assigned as a cornet (meaning the 2LT in cavalry) to the Chevalier Guard regiment where he was given command of a squadron. After two years he was assigned a duty of the Regimental adjutant in the same regiment. In December 1897, he was promoted to Poruchik (1LT). In 1897 Skoropadsky also married Aleksandra Petrovna Durnovo, a daughter of Pyotr Pavlovich Durnovo, the Governor General of Moscow (see Durnovo).

Skoropadsky's first major assignment was a sotnia (company) commander in the 2nd Chita Cossack Regiment of the Trans-Baikal Cossack Host in Chita during the Russo-Japanese War. Later he became an adjutant to the commander of the Russian forces on the Far East General Nikolay Linevich. During the war Skoropadsky was awarded the George's Weapon and several orders. In December 1905 Tsar Nikolai II made him a Fliegel-Adjutant in a rank of colonel. On 4 September 1910 Colonel Skoropadsky was commissioned as the commander of the 20th Finnish Dragoon Regiment still continuing to be a Fliegel-Adjutant of the H. I. M. Retinue. On 15 April 1911 he was reassigned to the Leib-Guard Cavalry Regiment. Leib-Guards were the elite Russian military forces assigned for a personal protection of the emperor. On 6 December 1912 Skoropadsky was promoted to the Major General of the H. I. M. Retinue.

World War I 

At the start of World War I, Skoropadsky was given command of the reorganized 1st Brigade of the 1st Cavalry Guard Division (General Nikolai Kaznakov) as part of the 1st Army commanded by General Paul von Rennenkampf. Skoropadsky already worked for von Rennenkampf during the Russo-Japanese War when the last was commanding Trans-Baikal Cossack Host. On 6 August 1914 his regiment distinguished itself in battles near Kraupishken as part of the Russian invasion of East Prussia. Later he was appointed as a commander of the United Cavalry Guard Division which distinguished near Kaushen. General Skoropadsky also commanded the 5th Cavalry Division. On 2 April 1916 he was promoted to Lieutenant General and was commissioned the 1st Cavalry Guard Division. From 22 January to 2 July 1917 he was in charge of the 34th Army Corps. In July 1917, the decommissioned 34th Army Corps was transformed into the 1st Ukrainian Corps. In October 1917 at the first Congress of the Free Cossacks, he was awarded a title of the honorary Otaman. From October to November 1917 his 60,000-man Army Corps successfully defended the railway corridor stretching through Podolie to Polissya, Vapniarka – Zhmerynka – Koziatyn – Shepetivka and defended against the attacks from the Romanian front particularly the 2nd Guard Corps that was headed by Yevgenia Bosch.

Political career in Ukraine 

In April 1918, the invading Germans forced the army of the Bolshevik Ukrainian People's Republic to retreat, and made Skoropadsky Hetman of Ukraine.  According to Peter Kenez, "German troops occupied the Ukraine in order to extort as much food and raw material as possible, but the German high command was wary of penetrating deeper into Russia for fear of spreading their army too thin." 

Skoropadskyi was chrismated by bishop Nykodym in  Saint Sophia Cathedral. Some Ukrainian nationalists denounced him as a German collaborator supported by wealthy landowners. Some other Ukrainians considered him too pro-Russian and dictatorial. Among other things, Skoropadsky formed a cabinet of mainly Russian-speakers, Tsarists, and Slavophiles. Simultaneously, he committed Ukraine to federation with a restored Russian Empire. Despite these criticisms, by contrast with the earlier  Rada, his government was given credit in certain circles for forming an effective administrative organization, establishing diplomatic ties with many countries, concluding a peace treaty with Soviet Russia, and founding many schools and universities, including the National Academy of Sciences of Ukraine.

On 11 November 1918 Germany signed an armistice with the Entente - this left the Hetmanate's military and international support in doubt. In the same month an uprising led by the social democrat Symon Petliura started to take power in Ukraine. The uprising nominally restored the Ukrainian People's Republic, but power was vested in a Directoria, a provisional government of five directors chaired by Volodymyr Vynnychenko. Skoropadskyi signed an abdication document on 14 December 1918.

Exile and aftermath 
After going into hiding in Kyiv, Skoropadskyi retreated with the withdrawing German forces. He went into exile in Germany in 1919 and settled in Berlin's Wannsee district
near Potsdam. While living in Weimar Germany, Skoropadskyi maintained close personal friendships with senior government and army officials originating as far back as his military-college days. In later years, however, he consistently refused offers to collaborate with the Nazis.

In the final weeks of World War II in Europe, Skoropadskyi fled from advancing Soviet forces with the retreating German army. He died at Metten Abbey in Germany on 26 April 1945 after being wounded (16 April 1945) in Allied bombing of Plattling near Regensburg, and was buried in Oberstdorf.

His movement continued into the early 1980s, influencing a Ukrainian monarchist program based on the Cossack State model. It ended gradually with the aging of eastern-Ukrainian émigré communities. 

Skoropadsky's daughter, Olena Skoropadska-Ott (died 2014), resided in Switzerland, visited Ukraine several times, and was honoured for her historical writings.

Honours 

  Order of St. Anne 4th degree, 1904
  Order of St. Anne 3rd degree with swords and bow, 1904
  Order of St. Stanislaus 2nd class with swords, 1905
  Order of St Vladimir, 4th degree with swords and bow, 1905
 Gold Sword for Bravery, 1905
  Order of St. Anne 2nd degree with swords, 1906
  Order of St Vladimir, 3rd degree, 1900
  Order of St. George, 4th class,
  Order of the Red Eagle, 1918 (Prussia)

Family 

]

On 11 January 1897/8 in Saint Petersburg, Russia, Skoropadsky married the Russian noblewoman Aleksandra Petrovna Durnovo (23 May 1878 - 29 December 1952), a daughter of the Russian soldier and statesman Pyotr Pavlovich Durnovo (6 January 1835 - ?) (of a notable family of Russian statesmen and landowners) and wife Princess Maria Vasiliyevna Kochubey (Saint Petersburg, 17 September 1848 - Saint Petersburg, 15 February 1894) (of Ukrainian Cossack Kochubey noble family), paternal granddaughter of Pavel Dimitreievich Durnovo (Saint Petersburg, 6 March 1804 - Saint Petersburg, 12 March 1864) and wife (Saint Petersburg, May 1831) Princess Alexandra Petrovna Wolkonskaya (Saint Petersburg, 7 June 1804 - Saint Petersburg, 2 June 1859) and maternal granddaughter of Prince Vassili Victorovich Prince Kochubey (1 January 1812 - 10 January 1850) and wife Elena Pavlovna Bibikova (September 1812 - Saint Petersburg, 15 February 1888); and great-granddaughter of Dmitri Nikolaievich Durnovo (Saint Petersburg, 14 February 1769 - 11 February 1834, son of Nikolai Dmitrievich Durnovo and wife ...) and wife (Saint Petersburg) Marija Nikitichna Demidova (Saint Petersburg, 2 June 1776 - 25 May 1847, daughter of Nikita Akinfievich Demidov and wife Alexandra Evtikhieva Safonova), of Prince Petr Mikhailovich Wolkonsky (Saint Petersburg, 26 March 1776 - 27 August 1852, son of Prince Mikhail Petrovich Wolkonsky and wife Elisaveta Petrovna Makulova) and wife and relative Princess Sophija Grigorievna Wolkonskaya (? - Saint Petersburg, 26 March 1868, daughter of Prince Grigori Semenovich Wolkonsky and wife Princess Alexandra Nikolaievna Repnina), of Noble then Count then Prince Victor Pavlovich Kochubey, 1st Count Kochubey since 4 April 1799 and 1st Prince Kochubey since 6 December 1831 (11 November 1768 - Moscow, 3 June 1834, son of Pavel Vassilievich Kochubey and wife ...) and wife Maria Vassilievna Vassilshikova (10 September 1779 - Paris, France, 12 January 1844, daughter of Vassili Semenovich Vassilshikov and wife Countess Anna Kirillovna Razumovskaya) and of Pavel Gavrilovich Bibikov and wife Elisaveta Andreievna Zakharievskaya. The couple had six children: 
 Maria (1898 – 12 February 1959), who married Adam de Montrésor.
 Yelyzaveta (1899 – 16 February 1976), who married Mr. Kuzhym, a painter, sculptor, leader of Hetman Movement (1959–?).
 Petro (1900–1956), who suffered from epilepsy.
 Danylo Pavlovich Skoropadskyi (Saint Petersburg, 13 February 1904/6 – allegedly poisoned by the KGB, London, Middlesex, 23 February 1957), Leader of the Ukrainian Monarchists since 26 April 1945, who allegedly had one natural son by Alexandra "Lessia" ...vna Tuhay-Bey (Kharkov - ?), daughter of ... ...vich Tuhay-Bey and wife ... ...vna Sylenko: 
 Borys Danylovich Tuhay-Bey, since 30 November 2001 Skoropadskyi (Canada, 1956), who moved to Ukraine in 2006/2007, but returned to Canada in 2010, married firstly in Seneca County, Ohio, 10 October 1987 Debra K. Meredith, without issue, and married secondly Iryna ...vna Ustenko, by whom he had two sons: 
 Danil Borysovich Tuhay-Bey, since 30 November 2001 Skoropadskyi (Canada, 1998)
 Maksym Borysovich Tuhay-Bey, since 30 November 2001 Skoropadskyi (Toronto, Ontario, Canada, 17 October 2000)
 Pavlo (1915–1918), who died from disease.
 Olena (5 July 1919 – 4 August 2014), who married Gerd Ginder (died on 10 April 1945) on 31 August 1943, and married Ludwig Ott on 20 March 1948; her two children are:
 Alexandra (born 30 January 1954), she married Martin König and had one son Dimitri (born 1989).
 Irene (born 30 January 1954), unmarried and without issue.

Legacy 
In some Ukrainian cities there are streets named after Pavlo Skoropadskyi.

Ancestry

See also 

 Ukrainian State
 Hromada
 Free Cossacks
 List of Ukrainian rulers

|-

References 

 V. I. Lenin "Everybody On Food And Transport Work!" Endnote: "In November–December 1918 the Ukrainian workers and peasants rose up against the German invaders and their stooge, Hetman Skeropadsky. On December 14 Skoropadsky fled from Kiev."
 http://www.day.kiev.ua/175869/

External links 

 Biography 
 Secret Police of Hetman Skoropadsky, The Papers of the Provisional Government of Ukraine, 1918 (Translit. Russian: Tainaia politsiia getmana Skoropadskogo. Dokumenty osvedomitelnogo otdela pri kievskom gradonachalnike) from East View Information Services The Secret Police of Hetman Skoropadsky]
 Biography from Encyclopedia of Ukraine, vol. 4 (1993)

1873 births
1945 deaths
People from Wiesbaden
People from Hesse-Nassau
German people of Ukrainian descent
German expatriates in Ukraine
Monarchs who abdicated
Imperial Russian Army generals
Leaders who took power by coup
Russian military personnel of the Russo-Japanese War
Russian military personnel of World War I
Ukrainian people of World War I
Ukrainian people of the Ukrainian–Soviet War
Recipients of the Order of Saint Stanislaus (Russian), 2nd class
Recipients of the Order of St. Vladimir, 3rd class
Recipients of the Order of St. Anna, 2nd class
Recipients of the Gold Sword for Bravery
Ukrainian nobility
Ukrainian generals
Ukrainian War of Independence
Ukrainian anti-communists
Leaders of Ukraine
Heads of state of Ukraine
Ukrainian State
World War II refugees
German civilians killed in World War II
Deaths by airstrike during World War II